The Georgia Public Policy Foundation (GPPF) is a free market public policy think tank based in Atlanta, Georgia. The president and CEO is Kyle Wingfield. The organization's board of directors currently includes eight individuals. GPPF was established in 1991. The mission of the organization is "to improve the lives of Georgians through public policies that enhance economic opportunity and freedom." The organization has advocated for increased school choice through charter schools.

References

External links
 Official site

Organizations based in Atlanta
Non-profit organizations based in Georgia (U.S. state)
Political and economic think tanks in the United States
Think tanks established in 1991
1991 establishments in Georgia (U.S. state)
Libertarian organizations based in the United States